Point Turton is a coastal town  west of Adelaide, South Australia.  It is located in the Yorke Peninsula Council.

History
The town was named by a marine surveyor, Captain John Hutchinson, as a commemoration of a double wedding of two daughters of the then Governor of South Australia, Dominick Daly, at Government House. In August 1866, Daly's youngest daughter, artist Caroline Louisa Daly, married Henry Hobhouse Turton, manager of the Savings Bank of South Australia, while the eldest daughter, Joanna, married John Souttar, Manager of the Bank of Adelaide.

Demographics
The 2016 Census recorded the resident population of Point Turton to be 305 people. Of these, 56.3% were male and 43.7% were female.

The majority of residents (262 people, or 85.9%) are of Australian birth, with the largest international population being of English origin.

The age distribution of Point Turton residents is skewed higher than the greater Australian population. 77.9% of residents were over 25 years in 2016, compared to the Australian average of 68.8%; and 22.1% were younger than 25 years, compared to the Australian average of 31.2%.

Facilities
The Point Turton General Store is the main shopping facility in the town.

The Tavern on Turton is a hotel that opened in 2007.

The town also has a caravan park and some holiday cottages houses along the beachfront.

Attractions

Point Turton is notable for its fishing, being regularly featured on fishing programs.

See also
List of cities and towns in South Australia

References

External links
Yorke Peninsula Council

Yorke Peninsula
Coastal towns in South Australia
Beaches of South Australia
Spencer Gulf